Abhirath Reddy (born 20 September 1996) is an Indian cricketer. He made his List A debut on 11 December 2021, for Hyderabad in the 2021–22 Vijay Hazare Trophy.

References

External links
 

1996 births
Living people
Indian cricketers
Hyderabad cricketers
Place of birth missing (living people)